Virgil V. Vaughn (May 15, 1918 – February 26, 2007) was a professional basketball player who spent one season in the Basketball Association of America (BAA) as a member of the Boston Celtics during the 1946–47 season. He attended Western Kentucky University.

BAA career statistics

Regular season

External links
 

1918 births
2007 deaths
Boston Celtics players
Professional Basketball League of America players
Syracuse Nationals players
Undrafted National Basketball Association players
Western Kentucky Hilltoppers basketball players
American men's basketball players
Centers (basketball)
Power forwards (basketball)